Camposcia retusa, known commonly as the velcro crab, spider decorator crab,  or harlequin crab, is a species of marine crustacea in the family Inachidae. It is known for attaching living sponges and corals to itself as a camouflaging mechanism. 

The velcro crab  is widespread throughout the tropical waters of the Indo-West Pacific area, including the Red Sea.

Description

This crab has a shell size of 3 cm and with the legs it can reach 10 cm.

References

External links
Marinespecies.org
Eol.org
Doris.ffessm.fr
 

 

Majoidea